Annas bin Rahmat (born 7 November 1994) is a Malaysian professional footballer who plays as a centre-back for Negeri Sembilan.

Club career

Negeri Sembilan
Born in Seremban, Negeri Sembilan, Annas began his career with Negeri Sembilan youth team. He later played for Harimau Muda B for 2014 and 2015 season.

PKNS
On 2 December 2017, Annas signed a contract with PKNS after his contract with Negeri Sembilan expired.

Negeri Sembilan
In 2021 he returned to join the team Negeri Sembilan FC on a free transfer after spent two years with the team in 2016 and 2017. Has been with the team for two years since 2021 and has been a squad player throughout 2022. He has helped the team secure fourth place in the Malaysia Super League in 2022. It is an impressive achievement as the team has just been promoted from the Malaysia Premier League in the previous year and had shocked the other Malaysia Super League teams because Negeri Sembilan FC was considered an underdog team. He has made 27 appearances during his time with Negeri Sembilan FC since 2021.

Career statistics

Club

References

External links
 

Living people
1994 births
People from Negeri Sembilan
Malaysian people of Malay descent
Malaysian footballers
Negeri Sembilan FC players
Negeri Sembilan FA players
PKNS F.C. players
Petaling Jaya City FC players
Association football defenders